Milton Frederick "Toby" Fitch Jr. (born October 20, 1946) is a Democratic member of the North Carolina State Senate.  He is a retired North Carolina Superior Court Judge, serving from 2002 to 2018. Fitch also served in the North Carolina House of Representatives from 1985 to 2001 (70th district), prior to serving as a judge.

Electoral history

2022

2020

2018

2010

2002

2000

References

|-

Living people
1946 births
People from Wilson, North Carolina
North Carolina Central University alumni
20th-century American politicians
21st-century American politicians
20th-century African-American politicians
African-American men in politics
21st-century African-American politicians
African-American state legislators in North Carolina
North Carolina state court judges
Democratic Party members of the North Carolina House of Representatives
Democratic Party North Carolina state senators